Jason James Tindall (born 15 November 1977) is an English professional football manager and former player, who is currently the assistant manager of Newcastle United.

A defender during his playing days, Tindall spent the bulk of his career with AFC Bournemouth, making more than 170 appearances for the club. He briefly managed Weymouth, before returning to Bournemouth as assistant manager. Working alongside manager and former teammate Eddie Howe, Tindall helped lead Bournemouth's rise from League Two to the Premier League which saw them win three promotions in six seasons. 

After Bournemouth were relegated from the Premier League in 2020, Howe left the club and Tindall was appointed manager. He remained in the role for six months before he was sacked in February 2021 after a poor run of results. After a brief stint as a coach at Sheffield United, Tindall reunited with Howe as his assistant in November 2021 following Howe's appointment as Newcastle United manager.

Playing career
Tindall showed early promise, playing for noted east London youth side Senrab F.C., a club founded in 1961 by his father, Jimmy. Jason Tindall played in midfield with Lee Bowyer, and later joined Arsenal's youth set-up but suffered from knee issues.

Tindall was then an apprentice at Charlton Athletic, but was released and joined AFC Bournemouth on a free transfer in 1998 as a midfielder, becoming a regular in the side after being switched to central defence when Sean O'Driscoll replaced Mel Machin as manager. On 24 April 2004, in a 1–0 win at Peterborough United, Tindall made his last appearance for the Cherries for 18 months, when a knee injury recurred. After missing the entire 2004–05 season, he resorted to surgery in the United States with specialist surgeon Dr Richard Steadman, returning to action on 2 January 2006 as an 86th-minute substitute in the Cherries 1–1 draw with Scunthorpe United at Dean Court.

Released by Bournemouth in the summer of 2006, after a trial at Wycombe Wanderers, Tindall joined local side Weymouth as a utility player.

Tindall was re-registered as a Bournemouth player on Tuesday 24 February 2009, three years after his last appearance, coming on as a substitute against Dagenham and Redbridge.

Managerial career
Tindall was appointed as player-manager of Weymouth in January 2007, but was sacked a year later in January 2008 after a 2007–08 season record of only three wins, leaving the club in 19th, 5 points off of the relegation zone.

Assistant manager roles
On 2 September 2008, Tindall was appointed as assistant manager to Jimmy Quinn at Bournemouth. With the Cherries performing poorly under Quinn, being second last in the league table at Christmas 2008, Quinn was sacked in January 2009 with Eddie Howe promoted to Caretaker Manager, and after a string of good results, Howe became the permanent manager with Tindall as his assistant. The duo of Howe and Tindall became the youngest managerial partnership in the Football League, and they soon had a growing reputation as they saved the Cherries from relegation into the Conference National, then in the 2009–10 season led Bournemouth to promotion to League One, finishing 2nd behind Notts County. With Howe having to deal with a transfer embargo, leaving the team with a threadbare squad, Tindall was still registered as a player and made a handful of appearances in the Cherries promotion campaign in 2009–10. After a positive start to the first half of the 2010–11 season in League One, which saw the Cherries in the play-off places throughout the season, Tindall and Howe were drawing significant interest from other clubs. After committing their immediate future to the club on 12 January 2011, Howe and Tindall did a complete U-turn less than a week later as they were confirmed as Manager and Assistant Manager of Championship side Burnley, respectively.

After 18 months at Burnley, Tindall and Howe returned to Bournemouth in October 2012, with the club in the relegation places of League One at the time. By the end of the 2012–13 season, however, the duo steered Bournemouth to the Championship, returning the club to the 2nd tier for just the 2nd time in its history. After a 10th-place finish in the 2013–14 season, Bournemouth were promoted to the Premier League after winning the 2014–15 Championship. 

Tindall and Howe would lead the club to a narrow survival in 2015–16, before comfortable finishes of 9th, 12th and 14th in the following 3 seasons. In the 2019-20 season, however, Bournemouth's five-year run in the top flight ended after the club finished in 18th place. On 1 August 2020, Howe left the club by mutual consent and Tindall took over as manager on a temporary basis.

AFC Bournemouth
On 8 August 2020, one week after Howe's departure, Tindall was appointed as manager of Bournemouth on a permanent basis, following the club's relegation from the Premier League. He signed a three year contract with the club. On 12 September 2020, Tindall took charge of his first competitive match for Bournemouth, opening the season with a 3–2 victory over Blackburn Rovers.

Following a run of poor results at the start of 2021, Tindall was sacked on 3 February 2021, with the club eight points outside automatic promotion places.

Return to assistant coaching
On 13 March 2021, Tindall joined Paul Heckingbottom's backroom staff at Sheffield United as a coach. He was later appointed by Newcastle United as assistant head coach in November 2021 following the appointment of manager Eddie Howe, reuniting the pair once again.

Career statistics

Managerial statistics
Updated 3 February 2021

References

External links
 

1977 births
Living people
Footballers from Mile End
English footballers
Association football defenders
Senrab F.C. players
Charlton Athletic F.C. players
AFC Bournemouth players
Weymouth F.C. players
English Football League players
National League (English football) players
Weymouth F.C. managers
English football managers
AFC Bournemouth managers
National League (English football) managers
English Football League managers
Association football coaches
Burnley F.C. non-playing staff
AFC Bournemouth non-playing staff
Sheffield United F.C. non-playing staff
Newcastle United F.C. non-playing staff